Juho Montola (born 22 February 1999) is a Finnish professional footballer who plays for MuSa, as a defender.

References

1999 births
Living people
Finnish footballers
Turun Palloseura footballers
Salon Palloilijat players
Veikkausliiga players
Ykkönen players
Kakkonen players
Association football defenders
Musan Salama players
People from Rusko
Sportspeople from Southwest Finland